A yuga, in Hinduism, is generally used to indicate an age of time.

In the Rigveda, a yuga refers to generations, a long period, a very brief period, or a yoke (joining of two things). In the Mahabharata, the words yuga and kalpa (a day of Brahma) are used interchangeably to describe the cycle of creation and destruction.

Etymology

In the Latin language, juga or jug is used from the word jugum, which means "a yoke used to connect two oxen" (e.g. cali-juga = kali-yuga).

See also
 Hindu units of time
 Kalpa (day of Brahma)
 Manvantara (age of Manu)
 Pralaya (period of dissolution)
 Yuga Cycle (four yuga ages): Satya (Krita), Treta, Dvapara, and Kali
 List of numbers in Hindu scriptures

Notes

References

External links
 Vedic Time System: Yuga

Four Yugas
Hindu astronomy
Hindu philosophical concepts
Time in Hinduism
Units of time